The El Rahman mosque in Cherchell, wilaya of Tipaza Algeria is a 'Roman' mosque. 

The building was the former Cathedral of St Paul, itself built over the ruins of a Roman temple. The mosque has been in use since 1574.

Gallery

See also 

 Lists of mosques
  List of mosques in Africa
  List of mosques in Algeria
 List of cultural assets of Algeria

References

External Links 

 Images of el-Rahman Mosque in Manar al-Athar digital heritage photo archive

Buildings and structures in Tipaza Province
Mosques in Algeria
Religious buildings and structures converted into mosques